Mayurbhanj Lok Sabha constituency is one of the 21 Lok Sabha (parliamentary) constituencies in Odisha state in Eastern India.

Assembly segments
Following delimitation, presently this constituency comprises the following legislative assembly segments:

Before delimitation of parliamentary constituencies in 2008, legislative assembly segments which constituted this parliamentary constituency were: Jashipur, Bahalda, Rairangpur, Bangriposi, Kuliana, Baripada and Udala.

Members of Parliament

Election results

2019 Election Result
In 2019 election, Bharatiya Janata Party candidate Bishweswar Tudu defeated Biju Janata Dal candidate Dr. Debashis Marndi by  margin of 25,256.

2014 Election Result
In 2014 election, Biju Janata Dal candidate Ramachandra Hansda defeated Bharatiya Janata Party candidate Dr.Nepol Raghu Murmu by a margin of 1,22,866 votes.

2009

See also
 Mayurbhanj district
 List of Constituencies of the Lok Sabha

References

Lok Sabha constituencies in Odisha
Politics of Mayurbhanj district